The Legacy Continues... is the fourth and final studio album by Canadian hip hop duo Dream Warriors, released July 9, 2002 on ISBA/BMG Music, exclusively in Canada. It spawned the singles "Road of Many Signs", "Breathe or Die", and "Unstoppable". NOW magazine gave the album a 3 out of 5 rating, calling it "another set of jazzy, loose-limbed hiphop that skips from beats and rhymes to UK garage, Swizz Beatz-style bumps and dancehall." The album also included a remix of the group's best-known single from 1991, "My Definition of a Boombastic Jazz Style".

Track listing

References

2002 albums
Dream Warriors albums